An indirect presidential election (officially the 11th Federal Convention) saw the former Social democrat Minister-President of North Rhine-Westphalia defeat Christian democrat Dagmar Schipanski and the nonpartisan academic Uta Ranke-Heinemann, who had been endorsed by the Party of Democratic Socialism.

Composition of the Federal Convention
The President is elected by the Federal Convention consisting of all the members of the Bundestag and an equal number of delegates representing the states. These are divided proportionally by population to each state, and each state's delegation is divided among the political parties represented in its parliament so as to reflect the partisan proportions in the parliament.

Source: Eine Dokumentation aus Anlass der Wahl des Bundespräsidenten am 18. März 2012

Results

Presidential election
1999
German presidential election
Johannes Rau